Arrata may refer to:

Alfredo Vera Arrata (born 1935), Ecuadorian politician and Minister of Interior
Noralma Vera Arrata (born 1936), Ecuadorian prima ballerina and choreographer

See also
Aratta, land appearing in Sumerian myths surrounding Emmerkar and Lugalbanda, two early and possibly mythical kings of Uruk
Arata (disambiguation)